Pelópidas Guimarães Brandão Gracindo (16 June 1911 – 4 September 1995), known as Paulo Gracindo, was a Brazilian actor.

Partial filmography

 João Ninguém (1936)
 Tererê Não Resolve (1938)
 Está Tudo Aí (1939) - Batista
 Onde Estás Felicidade? (1939) - André
 Anastácio (1939) - Azevedo
 24 Horas de Sonho (1941)
 O Dia é Nosso (1941) - Campos
 Estrela da Manhã (1950)
 Balança Mas Não Cai (1953)
 De Pernas Pro Ar (1956)
 Copacabana Palace (1962) - (uncredited)
 A Falecida (1965) - João Guimarães Pimentel
 Tarzan and the Great River (1967) - Professor
 Terra em Transe (1967) - Don Julio Fuentes
 Na Mira do Assassino (1967) - Promoter
 Cara a Cara (1967) - Hugo Castro
 O Bravo Guerreiro (1968) - Pericles
 Copacabana Me Engana (1968) - Alfeu
 Antes, o Verão (1968) - Father-in-Law
 Salário Mínimo (1970) - Roberto
 O Bem Amado (1973) - Odorico Paraguaçu
 Tudo Bem (1978) - Juarez Ramos Barata
 Amor Bandido (1978) - Galvão
 Exu-Piá, Coração de Macunaíma (1986)
 Rainha da Sucata (1990) - Betinho Figueroa
 Deus nos Acuda (1992) - Ambassador Harold Cross
 Mulheres de Areia (1993) - Father

References

External links

1911 births
1995 deaths